The 2003 Philippine Basketball Association (PBA) PBA Reinforced Conference, or known as the 2003 Samsung-PBA Reinforced Conference, was the third conference of the 2003 PBA season. It started on August 30 and ended on December 14, 2003. The tournament requires an import or a pure-foreign player for each team.

Format
The following format will be observed for the duration of the conference:
The teams were divided into 2 groups.

Group A:
Alaska Aces
FedEx Express
Purefoods TJ Hotdogs
San Miguel Beermen
Sta. Lucia Realtors

Group B:
Barangay Ginebra Kings
Coca-Cola Tigers
Red Bull Barako
Shell Turbo Chargers
Talk 'N Text Phone Pals

Teams in a group will play each other twice and in the other group once; 13 games per team; Teams are then seeded by basis on win–loss records. Ties are broken among point differentials of the tied teams.
The top four teams per group will qualify to the quarterfinal round.
Best-of-three quarterfinal pairings:
G1: #1 vs. #4 / #2 vs. #3
G2: #1 vs. #4 / #2 vs. #3
The two winners in each group will play in the Best-of-five semifinals.
The two remaining teams that came out on top in their respective group will play in the Best-of-seven championship series. Losers of the semifinal series will battle for a one-game playoff for third place.

Imports
The following is the list of imports with the replacement imports being highlighted. GP is the number of games played in the conference.

Elimination round

Group A

Fourth seed playoff

Group B 

Red Bull had one win and two losses in their first three games with Ramel Lloyd as their import. When Scott Burrell, an eight-year NBA veteran and member of the 1998 NBA champion Chicago Bulls, came in to replaced Lloyd, the Barakos went on a 10-game winning streak and finish on top of Group B standings in a tie with Coca-Cola.

Bracket

Quarterfinals

(A1) Sta. Lucia vs (A4) Alaska

(A2) FedEx vs. (A3) San Miguel

(B1) Red Bull vs. (B4) Talk 'N Text

(B2) Coca Cola vs. (B3) Barangay Ginebra

Semifinals

(A1) Sta. Lucia vs. (A3) San Miguel

(B2) Coca Cola vs. (B4) Talk 'N Text

Third place playoff

Finals

References

External links
PBA.ph

Reinforced Conference
PBA Reinforced Conference